Patrick Modeste (born September 30, 1976 in Grenada) is a Grenadian football player, who represented Q.P.R., and the Grenada national football team as a defender. He currently represents FC Camerhogne.

References
 

1976 births
Living people
Grenadian footballers
Grenada international footballers
2009 CONCACAF Gold Cup players
2011 CONCACAF Gold Cup players
Association football defenders